Neozoic is a Red 5 Comics comic book title. It is written by Paul Ens, who worked on Star Wars: Evasive Action. The art is done by J. Korim and Jessie Lam. The setting is in a different universe where dinosaurs did not become extinct and the humans are no longer the dominant species. The protagonist is a female character named Lilli Murko, she is an excellent hand-to-hand combatant and uses a sword and a dagger.
The series has eight issues and they have all been gathered into one 216 page trade paper back as of May 2009. However an eight-page comic ("feeding time") was put out on May first 2010 for Red 5's free comic book day comic.

In April 2013 part one of a four-part limited series, Neozoic: Trader's Gambit, was published.

Reception
IGN states "The artwork is fantastic and the world Ens creates is emphatic and fun."

References

External links
 Official webpage

American comics titles